Darex Industrial is an American manufacturer of industrial bit sharpeners, and are currently based in Medford, Oregon.

History
Founded in Chicago in 1973.

Darex Products
Darex owns over 25 patents. Darex drill sharpeners can range from fully manual (XT3000 Manual) to fully automatic (XPS-16+).

Darex currently has five drill bit sharpeners in production consisting of the following:

 V-390- A drill bit sharpener and grinder that sharpens common point bits, the machine is designed for small shops.
 XT3000 Manual
 XT3000 Auto
 E90- An end mill sharpener and grinder that sharpens end mills up to one inch in diameter and six inch flute length.
 XPS-16+- A sharpener operated by an automated touchscreen.

References

Companies established in 1973
Companies based in Medford, Oregon
Manufacturing companies of the United States